Kent is a surname. Notable people with the name include:

A–D

E–H

I–J

K–M

N–R

S–T

U–Z

Fictional characters
 Ariella Kent, comic character
 Clark Kent, the secret identity of Superman
 Chris Kent, Superman's adopted son
 Conner Kent, Superman's cousin, human/Kryptonian hybrid
 Gabriel Kent, fictional character
 Jonathan and Martha Kent, Superman's foster parents
 Jon Lane Kent, son of Superman from an alternate future in DC Comics
 Jonathan Samuel Kent, Superboy in DC Comics and son of Superman and Lois Lane
 The Kents, fictional characters from The Kent Family Chronicles novel series
 Gilbert Kent, fictional characters from Hayate The Combat Butler

See also 
 Kent (given name)
 Kant (surname)
 Cant (surname)
 Kante (surname)
 Kantor (surname)
 Cantor (surname)

English-language surnames
English toponymic surnames
Turkish-language surnames